Nienkämper is a furniture manufacturer founded by Klaus Nienkämper in 1968. The North American company operates a 120,000-square-foot factory in Toronto's east end that produces furniture for office, residential, institutional and hospitality applications with showrooms in Toronto, New York, Chicago and Dallas.

History 
Klaus Nienkämper, who emigrated to Canada from Duisburg, Germany in 1960, is recognized for helping to introduce modern European furniture to Canadians at a time when modernism was just beginning to enter the country. In Making Toronto Modern, Christopher Armstrong argues that Toronto’s residents only started to adopt modernism in the 1950s, and that Finnish architect Viljo Revell’s Toronto City Hall, which opened in 1965, was a turning point for the city's Modernism movement. "Nienkamper threw himself into one of Canada's most optimistic eras," writes architecture critic Lisa Rochon, "when government-sponsored design centres in Montreal, Ottawa and Toronto opened and exhibitions travelled across the country." He supplied furniture to Moshe Safdie’s Habitat housing complex at Expo 67 in Montreal, the minimalist terminal of Gander International Airport, and the lounge at Toronto’s Pearson International Airport. In this milieu, Nienkämper established his eponymous furniture company in 1968, opening a showroom at 300 King Street East in Toronto in the same year. While the company began as an importer and manufacturer under license for such modern European brands as Knoll and de Sede. Nienkämper eventually developed its own furniture collections designed by international and Canadian designers.

In 2019, Klaus Nienkämper was the recipient of the Allied Arts Metal from the Royal Architectural Institute of Canada (RAIC) for his role in advancing furniture design in Canada. As one juror put it, "Klaus Nienkämper’s furniture designs are fundamental to late-century Canadian architectural history."

300 King Street East 
In Exploring Toronto, a guidebook published by the Toronto Chapter of Architects in 1972, Canadian architect Ron Thom points out "Klaus Nienkämper’s store" at 300 King Street East. Only a few years earlier, in 1968, Nienkämper had renovated the derelict building at the corner of King and Jarvis streets into a modern furniture showroom, which was the first of its kind in Canada. In the 70s, when Toronto bars closed at 11 p.m., Nienkämper ran a well-attended speakeasy in the store. Today, it is surrounded by residential design stores that are known collectively as the King East Design District. The showroom is presently operated by Nienkämper’s son, Klaus Nienkämper II, who rebranded it as Klaus by Nienkämper in 2001 and expanded the showroom's offering to include both Nienkämper and international brand designs.

Work 
Over five decades, Nienkämper has collaborated with a roster of designers and architects including Thomas Lamb, Tom Deacon, Yabu Pushelberg, Mark Müller, Scot Laughton, Karim Rashid, Shim Sutcliffe, Busk + Hertzog, Hadi Teherani, Andre Staffelbach, and many others on furniture collections.

With architect Arthur Erickson, Nienkämper produced furniture for Canadian Prime Minister Pierre Trudeau’s office in Ottawa (1976); the Embassy of Canada in Washington D.C. (1989), and Roy Thomson Hall in Toronto (1982). Working with architect Daniel Libeskind, Nienkämper produced the stainless steel Spirit House Chair for the Crystal addition to Toronto's Royal Ontario Museum, completed by Libeskind in 2007. The 50 lb., laser-cut chair was the architect's first foray into furniture design, and is linked aesthetically and spiritually to the museum's architecture.

Selected Furniture Awards 
Vox Conference Tables by Mark Müller, 1997

 National Post Toronto Bronze Award, 2003
 Best of Canada Award, 2002
 Design Journal ADEX Award, 2001
 NeoCon Best of Show, 2001
 National Post Design Exchange Gold Award, 2000

Kloud Collection by Karim Rashid, 2006

 The Chicago Athenaeum Good Design Award, 2007
 Design Journal ADEX Award, 2007

Metronome by Fig40, 2011

 Red Dot Design Award, 2013
 IIDEX/NeoCon Silver Award, 2011 

Heartbeat by Karim Rashid, 2019 

 The Chicago Athenaeum Good Design Award, 2019
 Interior Design HiP Award, 2019
 Best of NeoCon Editor's Choice Award, 2019

References 

Furniture companies of Canada
Design companies established in 1968
People from Duisburg
Architecture in Canada
Canadian design